Gileh Kola-ye Olya (also Romanized as Gīleh Kolā-ye ‘Olyā; also known as Gīleh Kolā) is a village in Esfivard-e Shurab Rural District, in the Central District of Sari County, Mazandaran Province, Iran. At the 2006 census, its population was 333, in 83 families.

References 

Populated places in Sari County